George Carlson may refer to:

 George Carlson (American football) (1897–1953), college football coach in the United States
 George Carlson (Canadian politician), municipal politician in Canada
 George Carlson (footballer) (1925–2006), Tranmere Rovers player
 George Alfred Carlson (1876–1926), governor of the U.S. state of Colorado
 George C. Carlson Jr. (fl. 2000s–2010s), associate justice of the Supreme Court of Mississippi
 George L. Carlson (1887–1962), American illustrator